The Piegan–Carway Border Crossing connects the towns of Babb, Montana and Cardston, Alberta on the Canada–United States border. U.S. Route 89 on the American side joins Alberta Highway 2 on the Canadian side.

Canadian side
In terms of the region, the earliest customs service began around  eastward at St. Mary's Crossing on the Saint Mary River in 1883, where the North-West Mounted Police (NWMP) collected duties and patrolled the border. St. Mary's closed in 1901. At that time, the Cardston customs postal collecting station upgraded to a customs office, operating 1901–1943. In 1904, the St. Mary's NWMP moved to Twin Lakes (present day Police Outpost Provincial Park, about  westward). Based about one mile north of border, the NWMP collected duties until a regular customs office opened, which operated 1912–1932.

The Carway crossing was established in 1926 with the completion of the Cardston Highway. Canada Customs officer Herbert Legg created the name by combining the words Cardston and Highway. Prior to the erection of the building, a tent was used for four months. William Roberts was the inaugural customs officer 1926–1938. The Port of Lethbridge provided administrative oversight.

The customs building was replaced in 1954.

In 1994, the border station hours were extended to match the 7am–11pm on the US side.

In 2020, the former hours of 7am–11pm reduced, becoming 8am–6pm.

US side

The customs station opened in 1926.

A station operated in Browning 1934–1946.

The highway connects Calgary with Waterton-Glacier International Peace Park, and the crossing is the third-busiest in Montana. Twenty homes for US border officials are near the station. The US replaced the 1933 log cabin-style border station, which is on the National Register of Historic Places, with the current facility in 2003.

In 2020, the US similarly reduced border station hours.

See also
 List of Canada–United States border crossings

Footnotes

References

Canada–United States border crossings
1926 establishments in Alberta
1926 establishments in Montana
Buildings and structures in Glacier County, Montana
Cardston